Butthole Surfers is the debut studio EP by American rock band Butthole Surfers, released in July 1983. It is also known as Brown Reason to Live and Pee Pee the Sailor (see "Title controversy"). All songs were written and produced by Butthole Surfers.

The album was originally released on Alternative Tentacles. The center label on vinyl printings invited listeners to play the record at 69 RPM, a joke referencing the famous sex position. The album's back cover features a mildly distorted image of famed Mexican luchador Santo.  Kurt Cobain listed the EP in his top fifty albums of all time.

Music 
The album consists of seven songs that mostly feature heavily distorted guitar with largely nonsensical, barely intelligible lyrics, alternately sung by lead vocalist Gibby Haynes and guitarist Paul Leary. Haynes also plays saxophone and drums on some tracks. Unlike later Butthole Surfers albums, no electronic instrumentation is present.

Having parted ways with their original drummer, Scott Matthews, shortly before entering the studio, Butthole Surfers used a number of different percussionists on this album. The last of them, King Coffey, is still with the band to this day. Bassist Bill Jolly was also a relatively new addition, joining after original bass player Quinn Matthews quit at the same time as his brother, Scott. Jolly would also play on the Surfers' first official live release, Live PCPPEP, and their first full-length album, Psychic... Powerless... Another Man's Sac.

Title controversy 
Though this EP is also known as Brown Reason to Live, Butthole Surfers is its official title. Firstly, "Butthole Surfers" were the only words to appear on the front cover of its original release. Furthermore, Latino Buggerveil's 2003 reissue of the EP, together with 1984's Live PCPPEP on a single CD, is titled Butthole Surfers/Live PCPPEP. Perhaps most importantly, it is listed as Butthole Surfers in the "Discography" section of the band's official website.

That said, Brown Reason to Live has a strong claim to title rights, and many fans refer to it by that name. The 12-inch vinyl edition was, and still is, sold as Brown Reason to Live through original label Alternative Tentacles, but it is unclear if it was initially released as such. Also, though the words "Brown Reason to Live" did not appear on the original album's packaging, 'A BROWN REASON FOR LIVING' was etched into the run-out grooves of early pressings of this release and 'Brown Reason To Live' was included below the band's name on later Alternative Tentacles printings (see image). Finally, Latino Buggerveil's reissue of this album is listed as Brown Reason to Live (together with Live PCPPEP) on iTunes.

Background 
The sessions for Butthole Surfers were made possible by an earlier Butthole Surfers concert at Los Angeles, California's Whisky a Go Go, where they had opened for Dead Kennedys and T.S.O.L. The band gained an early admirer in Dead Kennedys' lead vocalist Jello Biafra, who also ran Dead Kennedys' Alternative Tentacles record label. Biafra told the band that, if they got someone to loan them studio time, Alternative Tentacles would reimburse the studio once the album was complete.

According to guitarist Paul Leary, the band then talked Bob O'Neill, owner of San Antonio, Texas' BOSS Studios, (a.k.a. Bob O'Neill's Sound Studio, a.k.a. the Boss), into loaning them the required time. Joe Pugliese, a San Antonio music promoter, recalled that lead singer Gibby Haynes slept at the studio during these sessions. Mike Taylor, an engineer at BOSS Studios, assisted with the EP's production. Taylor would later record and assemble the contents of 1984's Live PCPPEP.

Track listing 
All songs written and produced by Butthole Surfers.

Side 1 
 "The Shah Sleeps in Lee Harvey's Grave" – 2:09
 "Hey" – 2:06
 "Something" – 4:36

Side 2 
 "Bar-B-Q Pope" – 3:36
 "Wichita Cathedral" – 2:22
 "Suicide" – 1:24
 "The Revenge of Anus Presley" – 2:25

Personnel 
 Gibby Haynes - lead vocals ("Hey," "Wichita Cathedral," and "Suicide"), saxophone
 Paul Leary - guitar, lead vocals ("The Shah Sleeps in Lee Harvey's Grave," "Something," and "Bar-B-Q Pope")
 Bill Jolly - bass
 King Coffey - drums ("Bar-B-Q Pope" and "Wichita Cathedral")
 Brad Perkins - drums on "The Shah Sleeps in Lee Harvey's Grave" and "The Revenge of Anus Presley" 
 Various musicians - drums (all other tracks)

Charts

References 

1983 debut EPs
Butthole Surfers albums
Alternative Tentacles EPs